Government College, Mananthavady is the oldest college of Mananthavady town in Wayanad District. The College is re-accredited by NAAC with A Grade, CGPA 3.01 (2nd Cycle).

Courses offered
  M.Com.Finance
  M.A Economics
  M.A English
  MSc. Electronics
 B.Com. Finance
 B.Sc.Electronics
 B.A.English
 B.A Development Economics

Notable alumni
 P. K. Jayalakshmi, Former Minister Government of Kerala

References 

 

Universities and colleges in Wayanad district
Colleges affiliated to Kannur University
Mananthavady Area